Thomas J. Bartosiewicz (born May 27, 1948) is an American politician from New York.

Life
Bartosiewicz was born on May 27, 1948, in Brooklyn, New York City and died November 23, 2005. He attended St. Stanislaus Kostka Elementary School and St. Francis Prep in Brooklyn. He graduated from Dartmouth College and graduated in 1969. In 1971, he received a scholarship from the Kosciuszko Foundation to study at the Jagiellonian University in Kraków, Poland.

He entered politics as a Democrat. On February 10, 1976, he was elected to the New York State Senate, to fill the vacancy caused by the resignation of Chester J. Straub. Bartosiewicz was re-elected several times, and remained in the Senate until 1988, sitting in the 181st, 182nd, 183rd, 184th, 185th, 186th and 187th New York State Legislatures. In June 1988, he announced that he would not seek re-election later that year, but pursue his interest in minor league baseball instead.

References

1948 births
Living people
Politicians from Brooklyn
Democratic Party New York (state) state senators
Dartmouth College alumni
Jagiellonian University alumni